(born April 11, 1974 in Ostrov) is a triathlete from the Czech Republic.

Krňávek competed at the first Olympic triathlon at the 2000 Summer Olympics.  He took thirteenth place with a total time of 1:49:38.01.

Four years later, at the 2004 Summer Olympics, Krňávek competed again.  He dropped to forty-second place with a time of 2:02:54.59.

Czech male triathletes
Olympic triathletes of the Czech Republic
Triathletes at the 2000 Summer Olympics
Triathletes at the 2004 Summer Olympics
1974 births
Living people
People from Ostrov (Karlovy Vary District)
Sportspeople from the Karlovy Vary Region